Bulbophyllum sutepense is a species of orchid in the genus Bulbophyllum from China and Southeast Asia. The small round pseudobulbs are closely spaced and each carries a single leaf.

References
The Bulbophyllum-Checklist
The Internet Orchid Species Photo Encyclopedia

sutepense